Pawły is the name of two villages in Poland:

 Pawły, Podlaskie Voivodeship
 Pawły, Warmian-Masurian Voivodeship